Lacs Region is a defunct region of Ivory Coast. From 1997 to 2011, it was a first-level subdivision region. The region's capital was Yamoussoukro and its area was 8,875 km². Since 2011, the area formerly encompassed by the region is the Autonomous District of Yamoussoukro and part of Lacs District.

Administrative divisions
At the time of its dissolution, Lacs Region was divided into five departments: Attiégouakro, Didiévi, Tiébissou, Toumodi, and Yamoussoukro. Attiégouakro Department was created in 2009 and was therefore part of Lacs Region for only a short time.

Abolition
Lacs Region was abolished as part of the 2011 administrative reorganisation of the subdivisions of Ivory Coast. The territories of the departments of Didiévi, Tiébissou, and Toumodi became the second-level Bélier Region in the new Lacs District. The territory of the remaining departments, Attiégouakro and Yamoussoukro, became the new Autonomous District of Yamoussoukro.

References

Former regions of Ivory Coast
States and territories disestablished in 2011
2011 disestablishments in Ivory Coast
1997 establishments in Ivory Coast
States and territories established in 1997